Nessus is a proprietary vulnerability scanner developed by Tenable, Inc.

History

In 1998 Renaud Deraison created The Nessus Project as a free remote security scanner. On October 5 2005, with the release of Nessus 3, the project changed from the GNU Public License to a proprietary license.

The Nessus 2 engine and some of the plugins are still using the GNU Public License, leading to forks based on Nessus like OpenVAS and Greenbone Sustainable Resilience.

See also
Metasploit Project
OpenVAS
Security Administrator Tool for Analyzing Networks (SATAN)
SAINT (software)
Snort (software)
Wireshark

References

External links
 
 Nessus 2.2.11 files and source code
 Nessus source code up to 2.2.9

Pentesting software toolkits
Network analyzers
Linux security software
Formerly free software